The Tönnies Group is a German family business in the meat industry that operates internationally. Its core business is meat processing of pork and beef. For pork, Tönnies is the German market leader. With a revenue of over €6 billion, the company is one of the largest meat groups in Europe.

The company is based in Brørup, Denmark, with its administrative headquarters in Rheda-Wiedenbrück in East Westphalia, Germany. Tönnies pursues an internationalization strategy with 25 foreign offices, German and international production sites.

History

The company was founded in 1971 by Bernd Tönnies, joined by his brother Clemens Tönnies a while later.

On July 1, 1994, Bernd Tönnies died. Before he died, he gave 40% of the company's shares to his brother Clemens Tönnies. After his death, his two sons Robert and Clemens junior Tönnies inherited the other 60% of the shares. In 2008, Robert and Clemens junior Tönnies both gave 5% of the share to Clemens Tönnies. In 2012, Robert Tönnies announced that he took over the 25% share of his brother, from then on owning 50% like Clemens Tönnies. Subsequently, Robert Tönnies claimed back the 5% that he gave to Clemens Tönnies, resulting in multiple legal disputes.

In 2015, Tönnies took over the Danish pork company Tican with 1,9 millionen slaughtered pigs in 2013/14.

On Wednesday, 17 June 2020, work was ramped-down at the Tönnies slaughterhouse in Rheda-Wiedenbrück due to an outbreak of COVID-19 infections originating from there. By that date, 657 employees had tested positive for the virus. That afternoon the district of Gütersloh closed all schools and children's daycare centres until summer holiday. It also closed all post offices and cancelled training for FC Gütersloh 2000 as well as an upcoming Black Lives Matter demonstration. By 20 June, the number of infections had exceeded 1,000.

Structure

The company has around 19,640 employees (as of 2021) and an annual revenue of €6.065 billion (2021, compared to €7.5 billion in 2019). The export share is about 50 percent.

Main owner and company's chairman is billionaire Clemens Tönnies with a share of 45% of the food industry giant.

The company is divided in eight business segments: pork, sausages and beef, convenience, ingredients, logistics, as well as international and central services.

In Rheda-Wiedenbrück, the company has its headquarters and operates Germanys largest pig slaughterhouse.

Controversies
The International Union of Food, Agricultural, Hotel, Restaurant, Catering, Tobacco and Allied Workers' Associations (IUF) criticizes Tönnies for "miserable working conditions", with more than 70% of the employees at the main plant employed under temporary work contracts.

In 2019, Clemens Tönnies was temporarily suspended from his position as chairman of the supervisory board of the German soccer team FC Schalke 04 because of accusations of racist statements. On 30 June 2020, Clemens Tönnies decided to step down from his role as the chairman of Schalke's supervisory board after 19 years in service.

In March 2022, Tönnies was criticised for trying to recruit meat factory workers among Ukrainian refugees at the Polish-Ukrainian border.

References

External links

Meat companies of Germany
Companies based in North Rhine-Westphalia
Food and drink companies established in 1971
Family businesses of Germany
German companies established in 1971
1971 establishments in West Germany